Waiau River is the name of several rivers in New Zealand:

 Waiau River (Coromandel) in the Thames-Coromandel District
 Waiau River (Gisborne)
 Waiau River (Hawke's Bay)
 Waiau River (Southland)
 Waiau Uwha River, Canterbury, formerly called the Waiau River
 Waiho River, West Coast region, traditionally the Waiau River

See also
 Waiaua River (disambiguation)